Mayor of Windsor may refer to:

Mayor of Windsor, England
Mayor of Windsor, Ontario